Madaba (Arabic مادبا) is one of the governorates of Jordan. It is located southwest of Amman, the capital of Jordan, and its capital is Madaba. The governorate is ranked 8th (of 12 governorates) by population and by area. It is bordered by Balqa Governorate to the north, The Capital Governorate to the east, Karak Governorate to the south and the Dead Sea to the west.

History

Many civilizations existed on the soils of Madaba, most prominent are the Moabites, Nabateans, Romans, and the Arab Muslim empires.

The city of Madaba is best known for its Byzantine and Umayyad mosaics, especially the Madaba Map, a large Byzantine-era mosaic map of Palestine and the Nile delta.

Biblical and ancient history
Many sites in Madaba Governorate are considered biblical sites, some of which are:
 Mount Nebo: according to the Bible, is the site where Moses viewed the Promised Land.  Mount Nebo, just west of Madaba city, formed part of the Madaba Diocese during Byzantine times. Here the mosaics discovered at the Moses Memorial together with those in the churches in the village of Nebo, in the 'Uyun Musa valley and at 'Ayn al-Kanisah carry inscriptions which date them to the times of the Bishops of Madaba from the late fifth century to the middle of the eighth century AD. 
 Um er-Rasas (Kastron Mefaa): lies on the southeastern steppes, also formed part of the diocese, laying as it is close to the Wadi Mujib (Arnon river), a natural boundary of the Province. Here were brought to light the splendid mosaics of the Saint Stephen Complex together with the Church of the Lions (sixth-eighth centuries AD), which complement the eighth-century mosaic discovered in the village of Ma'in.
 Mukawer: 15 km south of Madaba city, is where the Body of Saint John the Baptist supposedly lies after he was beheaded at the request of King Herod Antipas' niece. The site is located on top of a big mountain rising from the shores of the Dead Sea and overlooking most of the Dead Sea and ancient Israel.
 Madaba Map: The only complete mosaic map of Jerusalem from the Byzantine era.

Many archeological excavations with pre-Biblical and Biblical emphases take part during the summer months in Madaba Governorate; new discoveries are being made each year.

Geography
Madaba Governorate is bordered by Capital Governorate from the east and Balqa Governorate from the north, the West Bank across the Jordan River, and the Dead Sea from the west, and Karak Governorate from the south. Ma'in is a village in Madaba that is the site of a natural thermal waterfall. Its therapeutic effects are utilized by those with aching joints and skin irritations. a new tourist industry is growing around the site with the building  of a new hotel and spa.

The climate ranges significantly in the governorate due to the difference in altitude of the governorate's regions, the capital city of Madaba is at 798 meters above sea level, while the Dead Sea is at about 300 meters below sea level, resulting in a double digit difference in temperature between the two locations.

Economy

Tourism
Due to its richness of historic sites, and natural sites such as the Ma'in Hot Springs and the Dead Sea, Madaba Governorate depends mainly on tourism as a main source of income. The governorate is the fifth touristic destination following Petra, Jerash, Aqaba, and Amman.

Agriculture
The northern region of the governorate is agricultural, with a total area of 59 km2 of fruit and olive farms. The governorates production of olives and fruits is eighth on the kingdom (after Balqa, Irbid, Mafraq, The Capital, Ajloun, Jerash, and Zarqa governorates).

Administrative divisions

Article 12 of the Administrative Divisions law of the Jordanian Ministry of Interior divides Madaba into two departments:
Capital Department: with its administrative center in the city of Madaba, this department also includes 26 other towns and villages.
Dhiban Department: Includes 44 towns and villages, with its administrative center in Dhiban

Demographics

The population of districts according to census results:

Gallery

References 

 
Governorates of Jordan